Foscadh ("Shelter"; also written in Gaelic script as Foscaḋ) is a 2021 film, based on characters in the novel The Thing about December by Donal Ryan. The film premiered at the 2021 Galway Film Fleadh. It was selected as the Irish entry for the Best International Feature Film at the 94th Academy Awards.

Plot 
John Cunliffe (Dónall Ó hÉalaí) is a 28-year-old recluse, coddled by his parents, living on a farm in Connemara, Ireland. When his parents pass away, John discovers that he has inherited land in the way of a proposed lucrative windfarm development. Having never had to fend for himself, he has to grow up fast: navigating friendships, romance and matters of trust for the first time. Ó hÉalaí described his character as having been "sheltered all his life by his parents […] when he loses them, his story is him becoming an adult, and all that entails."

Production

Reception
Foscadh received its world premiere at the Galway Film Fleadh in July 2021, where it won the Award for Best First Film. Director, Seán Breathnach was awarded the Jury Prize for Best Director at the 2021 Newport Beach Film Festival and was nominated for a Zebbie award by the Writer's Guild of Ireland for his script in the feature film category. The film was also awarded the top prize, The Golden Tree, for best film at the 4th Kimolos International Film Festival.

See also
 List of submissions to the 94th Academy Awards for Best International Feature Film
 List of Irish submissions for the Academy Award for Best International Feature Film

References

External links
 

2021 films
Irish-language films
Films set in Ireland
Films shot in Ireland